Prunus kinabaluensis is a species of flowering plant in the family Rosaceae. It is found in Borneo and the Philippines.

References

kinabaluensis
Flora of Borneo
Flora of the Philippines
Conservation dependent plants
Near threatened flora of Asia
Taxonomy articles created by Polbot